William Clyde Elliott (born October 8, 1955), also known as Awesome Bill from Dawsonville, Million Dollar Bill, or Wild Bill is an American former professional stock car racing driver. He competes full time in the Camping World Superstar Racing Experience. He won the 1988 Winston Cup Championship and garnered 44 wins in that series, including two Daytona 500 victories in 1985 and 1987, three Southern 500 victories in 1985, 1988, and 1994, one Winston 500 victory in 1985, one Brickyard 400 victory in 2002, one "The Winston All-Star Race" (non-points race) win in 1986,  and a record four consecutive wins at Michigan International Speedway between 1985 and 1986 (7 wins overall at Michigan, the most at any one racetrack in his career).

With the usage of restrictor plates at Daytona and Talladega since 1988, it is highly unlikely that these two qualifying speed records will ever be topped. Elliott also holds the distinction of recording a track record at Talladega Superspeedway of 6 consecutive pole positions from 1985 to 1987.

In 1985, Elliott made history by winning the first-ever Winston Million, a million-dollar bonus to any driver that could win three out of the four crown jewel races of NASCAR: The Daytona 500 at Daytona, the Winston 500 at Talladega, the World 600 at Charlotte, and the Southern 500 at Darlington. In a year dominated by Elliott, Bill went on to win 11 races (with 4 "season sweeps": Atlanta, Pocono, Michigan, and Darlington) and 11 poles, with three of those 11 wins being in the Daytona 500, the Winston 500, and the Southern 500, earning Bill the "Winston Million Dollar Bonus" and earning him the nickname "Million Dollar Bill".

Elliott won NASCAR's Most Popular Driver Award a record 16 times (1984-1988, 1991–2000, 2002). He withdrew his name from the ballot for that award after winning it in 2002. In 2005, the Georgia State Legislature declared October 8 as Bill Elliott Day in the state of Georgia. Elliott was named one of NASCAR's 50 Greatest Drivers in 1998, and has been inducted into numerous racing and motorsports Halls of Fame, including being inducted into the Georgia Sports Hall of Fame in 1998, and being an inaugural inductee into the Georgia Racing Hall of Fame in 2002. He was inducted into the Motorsports Hall of Fame of America on August 15, 2007, inducted into the National Motorsports Press Association Hall of Fame at Darlington in 2015,  and into the 2015 class of the NASCAR Hall of Fame. Elliott has also been honored by the state legislature with a stretch of roadway (the entirety of Georgia State Route 183) in his native Dawson County renamed Elliott Family Parkway.

Elliott's son Chase was the 2020 NASCAR Cup Series champion. The Elliotts became the third father-son NASCAR champions in history, along with Lee and Richard Petty, and Ned and Dale Jarrett.

Personal life

William Clyde Elliott was born in Dawsonville, Georgia on October 8, 1955. According to his autobiography, many generations of Elliotts resided there. He was named after two relatives and is the youngest of three boys. His parents were Erving "George" Elliott Jr. (1924-1998) and Mildred Reece (1921-1991) His father George created a lumber company and loved racing, and later created a speed shop where Bill's brothers, Ernie (born 1947) and Dan (born 1951), worked. His father was also a Ford person and later created a Ford dealership as there were none in the area.

Elliott has two daughters, Starr and Brittany, and one son, William Clyde II (nicknamed "Chase"). The 2014 NASCAR Nationwide Series champion and the 2020 NASCAR Cup Series champion, Chase Elliott currently competes in the NASCAR Cup Series for Hendrick Motorsports in the No. 9 Chevrolet. Brittany Elliott joined the Air Force Security Forces.

NASCAR career

Elliott/Melling years

Elliott Racing
Driving a car owned by his father, George Elliott, Elliott made his first Winston Cup Series start at Rockingham in 1976. He qualified 34th in a field of 36 cars, and finished 33rd; Elliott only lasted 32 laps that day before the oil pump failed in his Ford Torino. Elliott toiled for five years in the Winston Cup Series without corporate sponsorship, and along the way showed flashes that he could compete with the established veterans of the sport. In mid-1977, Elliott bought a Mercury Montego from Bobby Allison after his split from Penske Racing to replace the inferior Torino, and the move paid off. He soon earned his first Top 10 finish in the Southern 500 (10th), and his first top-5 finish 2 years later in the same race, finishing 2nd to race winner (and Elliott's boyhood hero) David Pearson.

In the fall of 1980, Elliott gained his first major sponsor in the form of $500 from Harry Melling of Melling Racing in the 1980 National 500 at Charlotte. Melling would extend his contract and give the team enough sponsorship to run a 12 race schedule in 1981. In the 1981 season, he had one Top 5 and seven Top 10 finishes in 13 races, including the team's first pole in the spring race at Darlington.

Melling Racing and the Beginning Years
Melling bought the team from Elliott's father George on December 1, 1981. In 1982, Elliott continued to show more and more flashes, and continued to flirt with victory lane more and more, as he finished the season with eight Top 5 finishes, and nine Top 10 finishes which included three runner-up finishes in the World 600 at Charlotte to Neil Bonnett, the Firecracker 400 at Daytona to Bobby Allison, and the fall race at Charlotte to Harry Gant. 

In 1983, Elliott picked up four more 2nd place finishes in the season, which included finishing runner-up in the Daytona 500 to Cale Yarborough, runner-up at Rockingham to Richard Petty, runner-up to Ricky Rudd in the summer race at the road course Riverside, and runner-up to Bobby Allison in the Southern 500 at Darlington. After 115 starts beginning in 1976, and eight 2nd-place finishes between 1979 and 1983, Elliott finally broke through and won his first Winston Cup race in the final race of the 1983 season — the Winston Western 500 at Riverside. With his first win to go along with 12 Top 5s and 22 Top 10 finishes, Elliott finished the season in 3rd place in the final championship point standings of 1983. 

Elliott gained full sponsorship from Coors in 1984 to the tune of $400,000 and won three races – the Michigan 400 at Michigan, the Miller High Life 500 at Charlotte, and the American 500 at Rockingham. He also collected four poles and finished 3rd in the final points standings for the second year in a row. The 1984 season also brought Elliott his first season of winning NASCAR's Most Popular Driver Award, and would begin a stretch of five consecutive years, from 1984 to 1988, where he would win that award.

The 1985 Season: Winning the Winston Million
The 1985 season was undoubtedly the best season of Bill Elliott's career. He scored 11 wins and 11 poles out of 28 races and also won the first ever Winston Million in the Southern 500 at Darlington. This would give him the nicknames "Million Dollar Bill" and "Awesome Bill From Dawsonville".

Elliott started the 1985 season first with a dominating victory in the Daytona 500, leading 136 of the 200 laps, starting from the pole position. This was the "first leg" of the Winston Million promotion that Elliott captured. His 2nd win of the season came three weeks later at his hometrack of Atlanta Motor Speedway, leading 129 of 328 laps. He would win again two weeks later, his 3rd of the season, with a win in the spring race at Darlington. Going into the "second leg" of the Winston Million promotion, which was the Winston 500 at Talladega, Elliott completed one of the greatest and most memorable comebacks in NASCAR history. Elliott was leading the race when he had to pit due to a broken oil fitting, which would then put him back about 2 laps. He completed one of NASCAR's greatest comebacks by making his way through the field, making up both laps under green flag conditions, and winning the race, his 4th of the season, and capturing the "second leg" of the Winston Million promotion. The following week, Elliott captured his 5th win of the season at Dover. Despite losing power-steering in the car, he led 336 of the 500 laps, and won the race being the only car finishing on the lead lap. Going into the "third leg" of the Winston Million promotion, which was the World 600 at Charlotte, Elliott had a chance to capture the million dollar prize. Elliott had a strong car, leading 84 of the first 155 laps, but mechanical failures relegated him to an 18th place finish. This was the only major of the four, that Elliott would not win in 1985 (a driver needed only to win a "small slam" of the four majors to win the bonus; Elliott, since he retired in 2013, would not finish a Career Grand Slam. However, Elliott had won twice at Charlotte Motor Speedway in 1984 and 1987, and had finished runner up in the World 600 twice, in 1982 and 1990).

After the disappointing finish in the World 600, Elliott rebounded with a 6th place finish at Riverside. He would then go on a tear during the summer months of 1985, first winning back-to-back races, his 6th and 7th of the season, at Pocono and Michigan. Elliott would then lead the most laps, 103 of 160 laps, and finish 2nd in the Pepsi Firecracker 400 at Daytona to Greg Sacks. He followed that up with his 8th win of the season at Pocono, then leading 100 of 188 laps at Talladega and finishing 4th, and then leading 90 of 200 laps and winning at Michigan, his 9th of the season. It was also during this stretch, Elliott would set an unprecedented NASCAR record of winning five consecutive pole qualifying sessions in 1985; the June Pocono race, the Firecracker 400 at Daytona, the July races in Pocono and Talladega, and the August Michigan race. That did not include the June Michigan race where qualifying was rained out, and the July Pocono race pole was where he started second, but further investigation led NASCAR to throw out the winning pole time for illegal fuel additives, retroactively awarding Elliott the pole award, money, and credit towards the season-long award for most poles won.

After a 5th place finish at Bristol, Elliott had a chance to clinch the Winston Million Dollar Bonus in the next race, which was the 4th and "final leg" of the Winston Million Dollar promotion: the Southern 500 at Darlington. Multiple media outlets went to cover the race, as Elliott had the chance to collect the million dollar purse which at that time had never been done in stock car racing. Elliott started the race strong, but had to fend off tough competition throughout the race which included serious threats by Harry Gant and Dale Earnhardt, who dominated the early and middle portions of the race. Harry Gant led 84 laps before the engine gave way on his car, and Dale Earnhardt who dominated most of the race leading 147 of the 367 laps, crashed out at around lap 318. In the final stages of the race, Elliott was leading and had to fend off a hard charging Cale Yarborough who was battling an ill-handling racecar after he broke a power-steering line. None the less, Elliott led 100 of the 367 laps and crossed the finish line first, winning the Southern 500 at Darlington, capturing his 10th win of the season, and winning the first ever Winston Million Dollar Bonus, which at the time was the largest single race payday in motorsports history. After the race, Elliott took a victory lap in a Pontiac Grand Am convertible with the President and CEO of Winston Tobacco Products at the time Gerald H. Long and NASCAR Hall of Famer Ned Jarrett conducting the victory interview. In victory lane, Long presented Elliott with the Winston Million Dollar Bonus while being showered with "Million Dollar Bills", which would then end up being one of Bill Elliott's infamous nicknames he would carry throughout his illustrious career. After the race, Elliott became the second NASCAR driver to be featured on the cover of Sports Illustrated, following Cale Yarborough after his win in the 1977 Daytona 500. 

After winning the Southern 500 at Darlington along with the Winston Million, Elliott had built a 206 point lead in the championship standings with eight races to go. However Elliott would lose the point lead after a string of poor finishes, which included a 12th a Richmond, 20th at Dover, 17th at Martinsville, and the transmission failing at North Wilkesboro, finishing 30th. In contrast, Darrell Waltrip won at Richmond, finished 2nd at both Dover and Martinsville, and finished 14th at North Wilkesboro, thus overtaking the points lead over Elliott. Elliott did come within 20 points of the championship lead after his 11th win of the season at Atlanta with one race to go. However in the season finale at Riverside, a 31st place finish due to a broken oil pump and a 7th place finish by Darrell Waltrip ended Elliott's championship hopes, as he finished in 2nd place in the final championship standings, 101 points behind Waltrip. The 1985 season was still historic for Elliott. Along with winning the Winston Million, he set a NASCAR modern-era record of 11 superspeedway victories in one season, and another modern-era record for completing the season sweep at 4 different tracks in one season: Pocono, Michigan, Darlington, and Atlanta. At the end of the season, Elliott was voted the National Motorsports Press Association Driver of the Year for 1985.

The Following 1986 Season
In 1986, Elliott won only two races, both being the Michigan races. With the season sweep at Michigan, Elliott became the first driver in NASCAR history to win 4 straight superspeedway races at one track (the record would later be tied by Dale Earnhardt Jr. at Talladega in 2003). He also won four poles during the season, and he finished 4th in the championship standings. He also won The 1986 Winston All-Star race, held at Atlanta. Ironically, Atlanta is his hometown track, being the closest to Dawsonville in the circuit. Also ironic, is that Elliott would remain the only winner of the All-Star race held somewhere other than Charlotte,  until 2020 when his son Chase won his All-Star race at Bristol.

The 1987 Season: Battling Dale Earnhardt, and setting the All-Time Fastest Qualifying Records
In the 1987 season, Elliott won six races, including his second Daytona 500 in dominating fashion, starting from the pole position (his 3rd consecutive Daytona 500 pole position), and leading 104 of the 200 laps. His other victories included the Talladega 500, another win at Michigan, and winning three of the final four races at Charlotte, Rockingham, and Atlanta. Elliott also won eight poles, and finished 2nd in the final point standings again, this time to Dale Earnhardt by 489 points. Elliott and Earnhardt were essentially the only two championship contenders all year in 1987, as both battled and tangled with each other all year. They both combined for winning 17 of the 29 races in 1987 (Earnhardt with 11 wins, Elliott with 6 wins), and finishing 1-2 four times that season, which included Earnhardt beating Elliott on a last lap pass in the spring race at Darlington, the TranSouth 500, when Elliott ran out of gas on the last lap. Elliott beat Earnhardt to the checkered flag three times in 1987 at Michigan, Rockingham, and the season finale at Atlanta. The most infamous moment between Elliott and Earnhardt occurred in The 1987 Winston All-Star race, when Elliott and Earnhardt tangled on the front-stretch at Charlotte, in what has become known in NASCAR lore as "The Pass In The Grass". 

However, Elliott's most lasting accomplishment that year was setting two NASCAR qualifying records, which stand to this day. In both races, he used a Ford Thunderbird which contained an engine built by his brother Ernie Elliott. However, at Talladega, Bobby Allison was spun and went airborne into the catch fence, tearing a large section away and injuring several fans. After this incident, NASCAR mandated the use of restrictor plates at Daytona and Talladega. As a result, Elliott's speed records will likely never be broken.

The 1988 Winston Cup Championship Season
In 1988, Elliott had one of the greatest seasons of his career when his captured his first and only Winston Cup Championship in NASCAR. In 29 races, Elliott won another six races, won another six poles, had a string of 16 consecutive Top 10 finishes, and did not have a race where he finished outside the Top 20. 

His first win of the season was at Bristol, where he was spun out by Geoff Bodine late in the race, but after pitting made his way back in the final 4 laps and won the race. Elliott won his second race of the season at Dover, leading 203 of 500 laps. In the June race at Pocono, Elliott finished 10th and would begin a string of 16 consecutive finishes inside the Top 10. During that run, Elliott finished runner-up in the first Michigan race, then won back-to-back races in the summer, the first one being his first Pepsi Firecracker 400 win at Daytona, followed by the July race at Pocono. After back-to-back 3rd place finishes at Watkins Glen and Michigan, Elliott overtook the points lead for the first time in the season with a 2nd place finish in the second race at Bristol. Elliott followed up taking the points lead after Bristol, by winning two of the next three races, both in dominating fashion; the first being his second Southern 500 victory at Darlington leading 154 of 367 laps, and then leading 392 of 500 laps completing the season sweep at Dover. 

Going into the season finale, Elliott looked to win his first NASCAR Winston Cup championship at his home track of Atlanta. His only threat to the championship was Rusty Wallace, who entered the race winning three of the last four races and was 79 points behind Elliott. Elliott started 29th, but needed to finish 18th or better to clinch the championship regardless of what Rusty Wallace did in the race. Rusty dominated the race, starting on the pole, leading 166 of the 325 laps, and winning the race. Elliott drove careful and conservatively through the field and finished 11th to claim the 1988 Winston Cup Championship by 24 points over Rusty Wallace. Elliott finished the season with six wins, six poles, 15 Top 5s, 22 Top 10s (including at one point 16 in a row), and an average finish of 6.6.

The Final Years at Melling Racing
Following his championship season, Elliott broke his wrist in a crash during testing at Daytona and required relief by Jody Ridley during several races in the first part of the 1989 season. Elliott won two poles and three races, at Michigan, Pocono, and Phoenix, and finished 6th in the championship standings. 

In 1990, Elliott won one race, at Dover, and two poles and finished 4th in the championship standings. In the 1990 race at Atlanta, Elliott's rear tire changer Mike Rich was killed when Ricky Rudd lost control of his car, spun, and slammed the crew member between his car and Elliott's. As a result, NASCAR restricted the cars' speed on pit road. 

The 1991 season saw Elliott's sponsorship change to Coors Light and the familiar red on the car was replaced with blue. Elliott would only win once that year in the Pepsi 400 at Daytona and won two poles. After a year of struggle, Elliott finished a disappointing 11th in the championship standings, causing him and Coors to part ways with the Mellings. That lone win in 1991 would be the only time in his career that Elliott won in a car that was not painted red. 

Overall, in 10 seasons from 1982-1991, Melling Racing set several NASCAR records, winning the Winston Million in 1985, winning the 1988 Winston Cup Championship, and winning a total of 34 career races, all of these accomplishments with only Elliott. The success of Melling Racing may have come to an end after Elliott left at the end of 1991, but Elliott would be more successful in the years to come.

Junior Johnson and Associates

The 1992 Season and the Hooters 500 Season Finale
Elliott left Melling to join Junior Johnson & Associates in 1992, replacing Geoffrey Bodine in the No. 11 Budweiser-sponsored Ford. Elliott would find success almost immediately in 1992. After a disappointing 27th place finish in the Daytona 500, Elliott would then win the next four consecutive races at Rockingham, Richmond, Atlanta, and Darlington. Elliott's strong season would continue, which included a 2nd place finish at Talladega, leading the most laps at Sonoma finishing 5th, leading the most laps at the second Michigan race finishing 3rd, and leading the most laps, 261 of 500 laps, in the fall race at Dover and finishing 2nd.

After the fall Dover race, Elliott found himself with a 154 point lead in the championship standings with six races remaining. However, much like the ending of the 1985 season, Elliott would lose the point lead after a string of poor finishes. Elliott's lead disappeared thanks to a batch of poor finishes, which included mechanical problems beginning with an engine failure at Martinsville leading to a 30th place finish, a 26th place finish at North Wilkesboro, a broken sway bar while running in the Top 5 with less than 40 laps to go at Charlotte leading to a 30th place finish, and a cracked cylinder head leading to another engine failure at Phoenix, finishing 31st. The string of poor finishes dropped Elliott out of the points lead to 3rd place, 40 points behind 1st place Davey Allison and 10 points behind 2nd place Alan Kulwicki, with one race to go.

The season finale in 1992 was the Hooters 500 at Atlanta, and is regarded by many as one of the greatest races in NASCAR history. It was the final career race for NASCAR legend Richard Petty, while future NASCAR legend Jeff Gordon was making his first career start. Six drivers had a mathematical shot to win the championship, with the points leader Davey Allison, Alan Kulwicki, and Bill Elliott being the primary contenders. Harry Gant, Kyle Petty, and Mark Martin also had long shots to win the championship. After Davey Allison crashed out late in the race, the championship came down to Elliott and Kulwicki who ran 1-2 together throughout the later stages of the race. The championship would be determined between the two, by whoever picked up the five extra bonus points for leading the most laps in the race. Elliott would go on to win the race leading 102 of the 325 laps, while Alan Kulwicki finished 2nd to Elliott, leading 103 of the 325 laps. Kulwicki picked up the five point bonus for leading one single lap more than Elliott, and by finishing 2nd was able to maintain and keep his 10 point cushion on Elliott to win the 1992 Winston Cup Championship. Had Kulwicki not led the most laps, Elliott would have finished tied with him for the points lead and would have been awarded the championship on a tiebreaker due to him having more wins in 1992 (Elliott had won five races that year, to Kulwicki's two). Elliott finished the 1992 season with five wins, three poles, 14 Top 5s, 17 Top 10s, and finishing 2nd in the final championship standings for a 3rd time, this time by only a mere 10 points which remained the closet margin in NASCAR history until 2004, and eventually the 2011 season.

The Final Years at Junior Johnson & Associates
Elliott went winless for the first time in 10 years during the 1993 season and finished 8th in the standings. Elliott did however pick up his first, and one lone career win in the Xfinity Series (formerly known at the time, as the Busch Grand National Series) in 1993, at the road course of Watkins Glen. 

Elliott scored just one win the following season in 1994; his 3rd win in the Mountain Dew Southern 500 at Darlington. It was the 40th win of Elliott's career, and would be the last win Elliott would capture in NASCAR until 2001, more than six years later. It also eventually became the final win for the team of Junior Johnson & Associates. Elliott finished the 1994 season finishing 10th in the championship standings. After his Darlington victory, Elliott announced he would be leaving Junior Johnson & Associates, and start his own team with sponsorship from McDonald's (leaving Johnson's other car, the No. 27 of Jimmy Spencer) beginning in 1995.

Driver/Owner

Elliott-Hardy Racing

After leaving Johnson's team, Elliott fielded his own Winston Cup race team from 1995 to 2000. He used the No. 94 in honor of his nephew, Casey Elliott, who was battling cancer at the time he formed the team and would die in 1996. 
The team also fielded entries in the Busch Series and Truck Series.
Elliott failed to win a race during this time, though he did manage two top-ten finishes in the championship standings, with 8th-place finishes in 1995 and 1997.
In 1996, Elliott missed five races to recover from injuring a broken hip at Talladega and was replaced by Dorsey Schroeder and Todd Bodine.

Bill Elliott Racing
In July 1996, the partnership between Elliott and Hardy was dissolved, the team being renamed Bill Elliott Racing. Later in 1996, Elliott suffered effects after an accident at Talladega earlier in the year and, Elliott missed two races and was replaced by Tommy Kendall and Bobby Hillin Jr. Elliott also made his first career start in the Camping World Truck Series driving for Jim Smith's team Ultra Motorsports at Las Vegas Motor Speedway, finishing 2nd.

The 1997 season, was undoubtedly Elliott's best season as a driver/owner statistically. He finished the season with one pole, five Top 5 finishes, 14 Top 10 finishes, and finishing 8th in the final point standings. Elliott did not win any races, but came extremely close on several occasions. He was leading late in the 1997 Daytona 500, leading with less than 10 laps to go, until a late caution came out. On the ensuing restart, he would then get ganged up by the Hendrick Motorsports teammates of eventual winner Jeff Gordon, Terry Labonte, and Ricky Craven, ultimately finishing 4th. Elliott's best finish during his six year run as a driver/owner was at Michigan in 1997, finishing 2nd to Ernie Irvan. Elliott also dominated that year's Mountain Dew Southern 500 leading 181 of the 367 laps, but finished 4th to eventual winner Jeff Gordon, who ironically, along with winning the race also joined Elliott as the only winners of the Winston Million, as Jeff won the "final running" of the Winston Million promotion in 1997, while Bill won the "initial running" of the promotion in 1985. 

In 1998, Elliott teamed up with Dan Marino to form a multi-car team, the team was renamed Elliott-Marino Motorsports, adding the No. 13 and keeping the No. 94, Marino owned the No. 13 while Elliott owned the No. 94. The year was marked with sadness for Elliott when he had to miss the fall Dover race to attend the funeral of his father. Matt Kenseth drove Elliott's No. 94 and finished sixth in his Cup debut.

After a disappointing 1999 season which saw Elliott's multi-car operation dissolve back into No. 94, Elliott announced in early 2000 he was selling his equipment to championship-winning crew chief Ray Evernham to become part of Dodge's return to NASCAR. The team would also switch to No. 9, which was owned by Melling, his championship-winning team. Even though he struggled the entire six years as a driver/owner and did not win a single race, Elliott's fans still voted him as NASCAR's Most Popular Driver. He would hold the record for 10 straight years as a most popular driver from 1991 to 2000, a record that would stand until 2013, when Dale Earnhardt Jr. would win his 11th straight award. Earnhardt would win the award for 15 straight years from 2003 to 2017, a NASCAR record.

Evernham Motorsports

The 2001 Season: Dodge's return to NASCAR and Elliott's first win in 7 years
In 2000, Elliott sold his team to Ray Evernham and began driving the No. 9 Dodge Dealers/UAW-sponsored Dodge Intrepid the following year. Melling Racing, who ran the No. 9 for Bill Elliott from 1981 to 1991, yielded that number to Ray Evernham for 2001. Elliott asked Evernham to drive that number out of respect for his old team. Elliott and Evernham however found success in its very first race in the No. 9 Dodge, as Elliott won the pole for the 2001 Daytona 500. It would also be the 50th pole of his career. By winning the pole, Bill Elliott would become the first, and as of 2018, the only driver in NASCAR history to score his 50th career pole in the Daytona 500. He would finish the race in the Top 5, bringing home a 5th-place finish, even though the race will forever be remembered for the death of fan-favorite Dale Earnhardt. 

Elliott finished his first season with Evernham Motorsports with two poles, five Top 5s, and nine Top 10 finishes, and one win at the Pennzoil Freedom 400 at Homestead-Miami from the pole position. Elliott won the race by passing his Evernham Motorsports teammate Casey Atwood with five laps to go. This was his first win since the Southern 500 in 1994, 7 years and 226 races. As of 2022, the 226 race winless streak is the longest drought, between wins, in NASCAR history. However, after Melling yielded the No. 9 for 2001, Bill Elliott would win at Homestead driving that number, but this time, with Evernham Motorsports. It was the team's first-ever win. In another ironic twist, Elliott winning at Homestead would be the first time since Melling Racing and Bill Elliott himself at the Pepsi 400 in 1991, that the No. 9 went to victory lane. Elliott finished 15th in the final points standings for 2001. Elliott also withdrew from the ballot as NASCAR's Most Popular Driver, and encouraged his long-time fans to vote for his friend and long-time rival Dale Earnhardt. Earnhardt was posthumously voted as NASCAR's Most Popular Driver for 2001.

The 2002 Season: Back-to-Back Wins at Pocono and Indianapolis
In 2002, Elliott won four poles and went to victory lane twice in memorable back-to-back races. The first of those wins included the Pennsylvania 500 at Pocono, which at the time made Elliott the winningest driver at Pocono Raceway with five career wins (Denny Hamlin and Jeff Gordon have since surpassed him at 6 wins each). A week later, Elliott had one of the most memorable and dominant victories in the history of the Brickyard 400 at Indianapolis Motor Speedway. He started on the outside pole, and dominated the race leading 93 of 160 laps. In the closing laps, he and Rusty Wallace battled it out for the lead, with Elliott passing Rusty with 12 laps to go, en route to victory. 

After the back-to-back victories at Pocono and Indy, Elliott was 6th in points. Four weeks later after a 3rd place finish in the Southern 500 at Darlington, Elliott then found himself 7th in points with 11 races to go, and on his way to finishing the season in the Top 10 in points for the first time since 1997. After a 5th place finish at Kansas, and a 19th place finish at Talladega, Elliott was 8th in points with six races to go. However, a string of five consecutive finishes of 30th or worse, which included a 42nd place finish after a crash at Martinsville, and a bad water pump leading to a 39th place finish at Rockingham, ultimately dropped Elliott from 8th to finishing a disappointing 13th in the final points standings. Elliott finished the 2002 season with two wins, four poles, six Top 5 finishes, 13 Top 10 finishes, and for the 16th and final time in his career, Elliott was voted as NASCAR's Most Popular Driver.

The 2003 Season: Final Full-Time Season
The 2003 season ultimately became Elliott's final full-time season. It was a struggle through the first 26 races of the season, as Bill only had five Top 10 finishes and was 16th in points. In the final 10 races, Elliott went from 16th in points to finishing 9th in the overall standings, as he finished in the Top 15 in all 10 races, had five Top 5 finishes, seven Top 10 finishes, and led the most laps in three of the final seven races which included Elliott's final victory of his career. 

In the final seven races of the season starting at Kansas, Elliott started 8th and led the most laps, 115 of 267 laps, and finished 2nd to Ryan Newman who won on fuel strategy. Elliott followed that up with a 4th at Charlotte, a 9th at Martinsville, and a 4th at Atlanta. Two weeks later, Elliott captured what would be the final win of his career at Rockingham (Ironically enough, at the same track where he made his first career NASCAR start back in 1976). Elliott officially started 5th, but had to start dead last in the back of the field due to an engine change after qualifying. He still managed to climb through the field and lead the most laps of the race, leading 140 of the 393 laps, en route to capturing his 44th and final NASCAR race win over future seven-time NASCAR champion Jimmie Johnson. A week later in the season finale, Elliott came within a lap of winning his final race as a full-time driver in the Ford 400 at Homestead-Miami. Elliott dominated the entire race, leading 189 of the 267 laps and was on his way to victory, but a cut tire on the final lap in turn 2 allowed Bobby Labonte to score the victory (which ended up, being the final win of Bobby's career). Elliott still finished the race in 8th place and maintained his 9th place position in the final points standings, his best points finish since finishing 8th in the 1997 standings. 

Elliott officially withdrew from the ballot as NASCAR's Most Popular Driver, giving the award to Dale Earnhardt Jr., who would go on to win for 15 straight years from 2003 to 2017, a NASCAR record. A few weeks later after the 2003 season ended, Elliott announced that he was relinquishing the No. 9 car to Kasey Kahne and switching to a part-time schedule driving R&D cars for Evernham.

Semi-retirement years

Evernham Motorsports 
In 2004, Elliott drove the No. 91 Dodge Intrepid for Evernham in three events (along with the Budweiser Shootout). While he only made three starts during his first part-time season with Evernham, he still managed to have some success which included 2nd and 10th-place qualifying efforts at Texas and Las Vegas, and also a 9th-place finish at Indianapolis which ended up being the 320th and final Top 10 finish of Elliott's career. He also brought back the Bill Elliott Racing moniker when he drove the 98 car twice in 2004, one with Coke C2 Sponsorship and one with McDonald's. The reason is that Evernham fielded cars with sponsorship with PepsiCo's Mountain Dew. He did also manage a 3rd-place qualifying effort at California.

In 2005, Elliott continued his part-time driving duties which included driving the No. 39 Coors Dodge Charger (in a paint scheme reminiscent of his 1987 Coors Light Ford) for Chip Ganassi Racing in the Budweiser Shootout and the No. 91 Evernham Dodge in several events. Although he made three more starts than the previous season, he did not have the same amount of success. He managed to get an 11th place finish and a 10th place qualifying effort at Michigan, along with a 9th place qualifying effort at Texas. He also competed in select NASCAR Busch Series events for Rusty Wallace and also drove the No. 6 Unilever Dodge Charger in the Busch Series for Evernham at Memphis, which celebrated the 40th anniversary of A Charlie Brown Christmas.

For the 2006 season, the 2005 owners' points for the No. 91 team went to the new No. 10 Evernham team and driver Scott Riggs and the 91 team was discontinued.

On August 8, 2006, Evernham Motorsports announced that Elliott would return to the organization for the race at Watkins Glen driving the No. 19 Dodge previously driven by Jeremy Mayfield. The team fell out of the top-35 in owners' points after Indianapolis, leading to the firing of Mayfield, and Evernham assumed that Elliott would guarantee a starting spot in the field by being a past champion. However, since the driver switch was made past the entry deadline, NASCAR said that Elliott was not eligible for the past champions provisional.

Mach 1 Racing 
Elliott also drove the No. 98 Dodge Intrepid for Mach 1 Racing in three other events in 2004 because of sponsorship issues between Coca-Cola (Elliott's sponsor) and Pepsi (Evernham's sponsor). but Evernham leased the car to him. Although he only made three starts during his first part-time season as a driver, he still managed to have some success which included a third-place qualifying effort at California respectively.

MB2 Motorsports 
On January 4, 2006, Elliott announced that he would pilot the No. 36 Chevrolet Monte Carlo SS for MB2 Motorsports in the 2006 Daytona Speedweeks events. This included the Budweiser Shootout, the Gatorade Duel, and the Daytona 500, which Elliott had not competed in since 2003.

Michael Waltrip Racing 
On March 17, 2006, it was announced that Elliott would drive the No. 00 Burger King-sponsored Chevrolet for Michael Waltrip Racing in five NEXTEL Cup events which included Chicagoland, New Hampshire, Indianapolis, California, and Homestead.

R&J Racing 
For the race at Kansas, Elliott teamed up with R&J Racing to drive the No. 37 Dodge. Elliott finished a season-high 16th at the Banquet 400 at Kansas but did not qualify for the Bank of America 500 at Charlotte two weeks later. Elliott was scheduled to be the Team Red Bull entry for Atlanta, but A. J. Allmendinger drove the car instead, Elliott instead drove the No. 37 Dodge at Atlanta, marking the 30th Anniversary of Elliott driving at his hometown track.

Elliott attempted to qualify for the 2007 Daytona 500, but failed to make the race in the No. 37.

Wood Brothers Racing 
Later that season, Elliott signed to drive the No. 21 for Wood Brothers Racing in 2007, in part due to his championship provisional, which guaranteed to start the race. Since fellow champion Dale Jarrett had used all of his guaranteed starts in his Toyota for Michael Waltrip Racing, Elliott was the only champion eligible for the provisional not guaranteed a spot by being in the top 35 in owner's points. His first race for the team was the Coca-Cola 600 at Charlotte, which he qualified without needing one of his six provisionals. He led the race at one point until he was involved in a wreck around lap 200. At Michigan, Elliott gave the team a much-needed 11th-place finish and was kept in the car until the fall Richmond race. The car then fell out of the top 35 again but at Bristol got back into the top 35 in points. Ken Schrader returned to the No. 21 replacing Elliott at a testing session at Talladega Superspeedway due to the team being back in the top 35 in owner's points. He returned for the final four races after the 21 fell out of the top-35 once again.

On September 23, 2007, in an interview with Charlotte Observer, Len Wood the co-owner of the No. 21 said Elliott would have his own sponsor and share a ride with Jon Wood and Marcos Ambrose for 2008.
Elliott returned to the No. 21 to try to get the car back into the Top 35 points at Lowes Motor Speedway.

Elliott qualified for ten races that season, with a best finish of 20th in the Sunoco Presents: The American Red Cross Pennsylvania 500 at Pocono Raceway. At Daytona, Elliott announced that 2008 would be his final season as a Sprint Cup driver. But in an interview on NASCAR Raceday at Kansas, Elliott was asked about him racing and said "We will be at Lowe's, and do a few more races. Then we will see how things go." In 2008, his best starts were 5th at Bristol and 7th at Kansas. His best finish was 12th at Homestead-Miami Speedway.

In 2009, Elliott ran 12 races in the No. 21 Motorcraft Ford for the Wood Brothers, including the Daytona 500. His best finish in 2009 was 15th place at Lowe's Motor Speedway.

On Memorial Day May 25, 2009, Elliott became the 7th member of the "800 club", with his 800th career Sprint Cup start at Lowes Motor Speedway.

Elliott ran for the Wood Brothers in 2010. He also drove at Talladega for Latitude 43 Motorsports.

Phoenix Racing 
In 2011, Elliott did not return to Wood Brothers Racing, but ran 4 races for Phoenix Racing in the No. 09 Chevy.  Bill stepped out of the ride to assist his son Chase Elliott in the K&N Pro Series East. Landon Cassill would take over the car for the fifth race of the season, which was eventually renumbered to No. 51.

Whitney Motorsports 
Elliott was entered as the driver of the No. 46 Red Line Oil-sponsored Chevrolet for Whitney Motorsports at Talladega but J. J. Yeley would finish the race.

NEMCO Motorsports 
For the 2012 season, Elliott joined Joe Nemechek at NEMCO Motorsports to drive the No. 97 Toyota in the 2012 Daytona 500, but failed to qualify for the race. Elliott successfully qualified for the Sprint Cup race at Talladega driving the 97, but finished in 37th.

Turner Motorsports 
Elliott made his third start of the 2012 season driving for Turner Motorsports in the July race at Daytona International Speedway, in the No. 50 Walmart-sponsored Chevrolet.  Elliott qualified 5th, and ran in the top 10 throughout the first half of the race, but finished 37th after being involved in an accident.  This was his 828th and final start in the NASCAR Sprint Cup Series.

GMS Racing

On August 4, 2018, GMS Racing announced that Elliott would return to NASCAR, driving the No. 23 Chevrolet Camaro at Road America in the Xfinity Series on August 25. It was Elliott's first Xfinity start since 2005 and first National Series start since 2012. He finished in 20th on the lead lap. After the race, he quipped "I feel like I hit everything but the lottery, I mean it was a great day."

Superstar Racing Experience

In 2021, Elliott was a full-time driver at the inaugural season of the Superstar Racing Experience, Tony Stewart's new stock car racing series. His best result was third at the Nashville Fairgrounds Speedway, and he finished 9th in points. Elliott entered two rounds of the 2022 season.

NASCAR video games
In 1990, Konami released the first officially licensed NASCAR game, Bill Elliott's NASCAR Challenge for MS-DOS.  The game was released for the NES and Amiga in 1991, and Bill Elliott's NASCAR Fast Tracks was released for the Game Boy at the same time.

Legacy and Honors
At the time of Bill Elliott's "semi-retirement", he ranked 14th on NASCAR's all-time win list with 44 wins. As of 2022, he ranks 19th on NASCAR's all-time wins list. His 44 career wins does not include six exhibition wins, which include one "Winston All-Star Race" win in 1986, one "Busch Clash" win in 1987, and four Gatorade Twin 125 wins at Daytona in 1985, 1986, 1992, and 2000. He retired with 55 career poles, which ranks 8th on the all-time poles list. Elliott won seven crown jewel races in his career, two in the Daytona 500 (1985, 1987), three in the Southern 500 (1985, 1988, 1994), one in the Winston 500 (1985), and one in the Brickyard 400 (2002). The only crown jewel race Elliott failed to win was the World 600 (he had a pair of second-place finishes in 1982 and 1990).

The majority of Elliott's success came in the 10 seasons from 1982 to 1991 with Melling Racing and owner Harry Melling, along with Bill's two older brothers, crew chief and engine builder Ernie Elliott and transmission specialist Dan Elliott. Together, they won 34 of Bill's 44 race wins, set numerous NASCAR records, won the Winston Million in 1985, and won the NASCAR Winston Cup Championship in 1988. Elliott was one of NASCAR's most endearing and popular drivers in history, as Elliott went on to win NASCAR's Most Popular Driver Award a NASCAR record 16 times (1984-1988, 1991-2000, 2002), a record nearly matched by Dale Earnhardt Jr. who won the award for 15 straight years from 2003 to 2017.

Elliott set numerous NASCAR records throughout his career, many of which still stand to this day. They include the following:
 Fastest qualifying speed at Daytona International Speedway; 1987 Daytona 500 - 210.364 MPH (338.548 km/h)
 Fastest qualifying speed at Talladega Superspeedway; 1987 Winston 500 - 212.809 MPH (342.483 km/h)
 Modern-era record of 11 superspeedway victories in one season; 11 in 1985
 Modern-era record of 4 season sweeps in one season; 1985 - Pocono, Michigan, Darlington, and Atlanta (The next closest is 3 season sweeps by Dale Earnhardt in 1987, at Bristol, Richmond, and Darlington and Jimmie Johnson in 2007, at Atlanta, Martinsville, and Richmond)
 4 consecutive wins at one superspeedway; Michigan from 1985-1986 (Tied with Dale Earnhardt Jr. at Talladega from 2001-2003)
 Modern-era record 4 consecutive race wins; 1992 at Rockingham, Richmond, Atlanta and Darlington (Tied with Cale Yarborough in 1976, Darrell Waltrip in 1981, Dale Earnhardt in 1987, Harry Gant in 1991, Mark Martin in 1993, Jeff Gordon in 1998, and Jimmie Johnson in 2007)
 Most career Daytona 500 poles; 4 in 1985-1987, 2001 (Tied with Buddy Baker and Cale Yarborough)
 3 consecutive Daytona 500 poles; 1985-1987 (Tied with Fireball Roberts 1961-1963 and Ken Schrader 1988-1990)
 Most career pole positions at Talladega Superspeedway; 8 (2×1985, 2×1986, 2×1987, 1990, 1993)
 6 consecutive pole positions at Talladega Superspeedway; 1985-1987
 Longest winless drought between wins; 226 races (1994 Southern 500 at Darlington - 2001 Pennzoil Freedom 400 at Homestead-Miami)

Bill Elliott is widely considered as one of the greatest and most well-respected racecar drivers, not only in NASCAR history, but in motorsports history as a whole. In 1998, Elliott was selected as one of NASCAR's 50 Greatest Drivers in its history, and has been honored by being inducted into numerous racing and motorsports Halls of Fame. They include:
 Georgia Sports Hall of Fame inductee in 1998
 An inaugural inductee into the Georgia Racing Hall of Fame in 2002 (Along with Elliott, the inaugural Georgia Racing Hall of Fame Class of 2002 also included Red Byron, Tim Flock, Roy Hall, Raymond Parks, Lloyd Seay, Gober Sosebee, and Red Vogt). Elliott's father George (Class of 2011), and his two older brothers Ernie (Class of 2010), and Dan (Class of 2018) would also become inductees into the Georgia Racing Hall of Fame.
 Motorsports Hall of Fame of America inductee in 2007
 National Motorsports Press Association Hall of Fame inductee in 2015
 NASCAR Hall of Fame Class of 2015 (inducted along with Fred Lorenzen, Wendell Scott, Joe Weatherly, and Rex White). Elliott was presented into the NASCAR Hall of Fame by his former Evernham Motorsports car owner, and future NASCAR Hall of Fame Class of 2018 inductee, Ray Evernham, and the driver who followed Bill in the famed #9 car, Kasey Kahne.

Elliott has been honored by the State of Georgia and the city of Dawsonville, Georgia in Dawson County with a number of roads renamed in honor of him and his family, as well as a date named in his honor.
 In 2005, the Georgia State Legislature declared October 8 (Elliott's birthday) as Bill Elliott Day in the state of Georgia.
 In downtown Dawsonville, East 1st Street N & S (North and South) was renamed "Bill Elliott Street N & S", which is also conveniently, where the famous Dawsonville Pool Room is located (at the address of "9 Bill Elliott Street S"), along with the infamous "siren" that traditionally went off when Bill Elliott won a race. Today, the tradition continues with Bill's son Chase, as the siren goes off every time Chase wins a race.
 Elliott was also honored by the state legislature with a stretch of roadway (the entirety of Georgia State Route 183) in his native Dawson County renamed "Elliott Family Parkway".

Motorsports career results

NASCAR
(key) (Bold – Pole position awarded by qualifying time. Italics – Pole position earned by points standings or practice time. * – Most laps led.)

Cup Series

Daytona 500

Xfinity Series

Craftsman Truck Series

Winston West Series

 Season still in progress
 Ineligible for series points

International Race of Champions
(key) (Bold – Pole position. * – Most laps led.)

Superstar Racing Experience
(key) * – Most laps led. 1 – Heat 1 winner. 2 – Heat 2 winner.

 Season still in progress

References

External links

 
 
 

1955 births
Living people
People from Dawsonville, Georgia
Sportspeople from the Atlanta metropolitan area
Racing drivers from Georgia (U.S. state)
NASCAR drivers
NASCAR Cup Series champions
NASCAR team owners
International Race of Champions drivers
American members of the Churches of Christ
American Speed Association drivers
Evernham Motorsports drivers
Michael Waltrip Racing drivers
NASCAR Hall of Fame inductees